Gabla may refer to:

 Ǧabla (Arabic:جبلة), a city in Syria, also known as Jableh
 Uí Gabla (clan), an Irish clan and surname, see List of Irish clans
 Gabla, the Mauritanian Arabic dialect, see Hassaniya Arabic

See also
 GBLA (disambiguation)
 Galba (disambiguation)